The Berry House is a historic house at 5805 North Farm Loop Road, near Palmer, Alaska.  It is a simple -story wood-frame structure with a gable roof.  It was designed by architect and community planner David Williams, and built in 1935 as part of the Matanuska Valley Colony project.  Despite a rearward extension in 1971, the building is a well-preserved example of the type of housing built as part of this New Deal project.  The house is named for James Berry, one of the project participants who was the house's third occupant.

The house was listed on the National Register of Historic Places in 1991.  It is owned by the National Outdoor Leadership School.

References

1935 establishments in Alaska
Houses completed in 1935
Houses in Matanuska-Susitna Borough, Alaska
Houses on the National Register of Historic Places in Alaska
Buildings and structures on the National Register of Historic Places in Matanuska-Susitna Borough, Alaska